Just Look Around is the second full-length album by American band Sick of It All, released in 1992. It is the follow-up to the band's first album, Blood, Sweat and No Tears (1989). "What's Goin' On" laments gun violence.

Track listing
 "We Want the Truth"  – 2:55
 "Locomotive"  – 2:12
 "The Pain Strikes"  – 3:06
 "Shut Me Out"  – 2:12
 "What's Goin' On"  – 2:10
 "Never Measure Up"  – 1:37
 "Just Look Around"  – 2:41
 "Violent Generation"  – 1:32
 "The Shield"  – 2:37
 "Now It's Gone"  – 2:10
 "We Stand Alone"  – 2:44
 "Will We Survive"  – 1:32
 "Indust."  – 2:03

References

1992 albums
Sick of It All albums
Relativity Records albums
Combat Records albums